The Department of Oregon was one of two Army Departments created September 13, 1858, replacing the original Department of the Pacific and was composed of the Territories of Washington and Oregon, except the Rogue River and Umpqua Districts, which were assigned to the Department of California.  Its creation was authorized by General Orders, No. 10, of the United States Department of War, Adjutant-General's Office, September 13, 1858. Its headquarters was at Fort Vancouver, in the Washington Territory.

Commanders
Its first commander was Brevet Brigadier General William S. Harney, U.S. Army, from 1858 to June 1860.  Shortly after he took command he sent troops under Captain George E. Pickett to San Juan Island precipitating the Pig War with Great Britain.  Due to these altercations with the British he was recalled in June 1860 by the United States Secretary of War who reassigned Harney to the Department of the West, replacing him with the victor of the Oregon Indian Wars, Colonel George Wright, of the U.S. 9th Infantry Regiment, from June 8, 1860.

The Department of Oregon was merged into the restored Department of the Pacific on January 15, 1861, as the District of Oregon administering the same territories, under Col. Wright.

Posts in the Department of Oregon

Washington
 Fort Colville, Washington Territory 1825 - 1870
 Fort Steilacoom, Washington Territory 1849 - 1868
 Fort Vancouver, Washington Territory 1849-1879
 Fort Bellingham, Washington Territory  1855 - 1860
 Fort Cascades, Washington Territory 1855 - 1861
 Fort Townsend, Washington Territory 1856 - 1861
 Fort Walla Walla, Washington Territory 1856 - 1911
 Camp Chehalis, Washington Territory 1860 - 1861
 Camp Pickett, Washington Territory 1859-1863

Idaho
 Major Howe's Camp, Washington Territory (Idaho) 1860 
 Fort Hall, Washington Territory (Idaho) 1859 - 1860

Oregon
 Fort Dalles, Oregon 1850-1867
 Fort Yamhill, Oregon 1856 - 1866
 Fort Hoskins, Oregon 1857 - 1865
 Siletz Blockhouse, Oregon 1858 - 1866 
 Camp Randolph 1859 
 Camp Owyhee, Oregon 1860  
 Camp Union, Oregon 1860 
 Camp Day, Oregon 1860

See also
 Department of California

References

Oregon
Military units and formations established in 1858
Military units and formations disestablished in 1861
Military history of Oregon
Military history of Washington (state)
Military history of Idaho
Military history of Montana
1858 establishments in Washington Territory